Dale Basil Martin (born 1954) is an American New Testament scholar and historian of Christianity.

Career 
Martin joined the faculty of Yale University in 1999 and retired as the Woolsey Professor of Religious Studies in 2018. Before Yale, he was a faculty member at Rhodes College and Duke University.

Martin has degrees from Abilene Christian University, Princeton Theological Seminary, and Yale. He was elected a Fellow of the American Academy of Arts and Sciences in 2009.

Personal life
Martin grew up in Texas and attended a fundamentalist church related to the Churches of Christ. He is currently a member of the Episcopal Church.  Martin is openly gay.

Bibliography

References

1954 births
Living people
Fellows of the American Academy of Arts and Sciences
American biblical scholars
New Testament scholars
Abilene Christian University alumni
Princeton Theological Seminary alumni
Yale University alumni
Yale University faculty
Rhodes College faculty
Duke University faculty
Anglican biblical scholars
20th-century American Episcopalians
21st-century American Episcopalians
LGBT Anglicans